LG.Philips Displays was a joint venture created in 2001 by LG Electronics of South Korea and Philips Electronics of the Netherlands in response to the maturing CRT market. It primarily manufactured CRTs used in traditional television sets. It was the world's largest manufacturer of CRTs.

These two companies also operated another joint venture, LG.Philips LCD, which focused on LCD panels used in flat panel television sets and laptop computers.

As of 2006, the company had run into bankruptcy and restarted under the same name with investments of a third party (JP Morgan). LG.Philips LCD was not affected by this bankruptcy.

LG.Philips Displays shares were sold in the beginning of March 2007. The company name has been changed to LP Displays from 1 April 2007. LP is a historic reference to the old parent companies LG and Philips. Since, the fate of the company is unknown, although it appears that its factories were later repurposed or sold.

References

LG Electronics
Philips
Multinational joint-venture companies
Electronics companies established in 2001